The Jabeniţa mine is a large salt mine located in central Romania in Mureș County, close to Solovăstru. Jabeniţa represents one of the largest salt reserves in Romania having estimated reserves of 77 billion tonnes of NaCl.

References 

Salt mines in Romania